This is a list of the Ireland national football team results from 1882 to 1899. From 1882 to 1921 all of Ireland was represented by a single side, the Ireland national football team, organised by the Irish Football Association (IFA). 

In 1920 Ireland was partitioned into Northern Ireland and Southern Ireland. In 1922, The south of Ireland gained independence as the Irish Free State, later to become Republic of Ireland. Amid these political upheavals, a rival football association, the Football Association of Ireland (the F.A.I.), emerged in Dublin in 1921 and organised a separate league and later a national team. In 1923, during a period when the home nations had dis-affiliated from the governing body, the FAI was recognised by FIFA as the governing body of the Irish Free State on the condition that it changed its name to the Football Association of the Irish Free State. At the same time, the IFA continued to organise its national team on an all-Ireland basis, regularly calling up Free State players. During this era at least one Northerner, Harry Chatton, also played for the Irish Free State and from 1936, the FAI began to organise their own all–Ireland team. Both teams now competed as Ireland and during this era at least 39 dual internationals were selected to represent both teams.
Between 1928 and 1946 the IFA were not affiliated to FIFA and the two Ireland teams co-existed, never competing in the same competition.

In April 1951, FIFA decreed that the IFA team could not select "citizens of Eire". An exception was for British Home Championship games, as a 1923 IFAB agreement at Liverpool prevented FIFA intervention in relations between the four Home Nations. However, the exception would only apply "if the F.A. of Ireland do not object", and was never availed of.

At FIFA's 1953 congress, its Rule 3 was amended so that an international team must use "that title ... recognised politically and geographically of the countries or territories". The FAI initially claimed Rule 3 gave them the right to the name Ireland (see names of the Irish state), but FIFA subsequently ruled neither team could be referred to as Ireland, decreeing that the FAI team be officially designated as the Republic of Ireland, while the IFA team was to become Northern Ireland. The IFA objected and in 1954 was permitted to continue using the name Ireland in Home Internationals, based on the 1923 agreement. This practice was discontinued in the late 1970s.

1880s

1882

1883

1884

1885

1886

1887

1888

1889

1890s

1890

1891

1892

1893

1894

1895

1896

1897

1898

1899

Notes

References

External links
RSSSF: (Northern) Ireland - International Results
British Home Championships 1884-1899
Northern Ireland Football Greats Archive
Northern Ireland Statistics and Records
England International Database From 1872
England Football Online
Scotland International Archive
Scotland Football Records Complete Record
Welsh Football Data Archive

1882-99
1882–83 in Irish association football
1883–84 in Irish association football
1884–85 in Irish association football
1885–86 in Irish association football
1886–87 in Irish association football
1887–88 in Irish association football
1888–89 in Irish association football
1889–90 in Irish association football
1890–91 in Irish association football
1891–92 in Irish association football
1892–93 in Irish association football
1893–94 in Irish association football
1894–95 in Irish association football
1895–96 in Irish association football
1896–97 in Irish association football
1897–98 in Irish association football
1898–99 in Irish association football
1899–1900 in Irish association football